Edward Victor David Parr, JP was a British businessman and unofficial member of the Executive Council and Legislative Council of Hong Kong.

Biography
Parr first arrived in Hong Kong in 1896. After that he had been stationed Shanghai, Japan and India. He returned to Hong Kong and became head of many leading companies in Hong Kong. He was the acting superintendent of the Peninsular & Oriental Steam Navigation Company in 1916. In 1920 he was elected by the directors as the chairman of the Hongkong and Shanghai Banking Corporation. He remained on the board until his resignation in 1924 on leaving Hong Kong.

He was active in the British business community and was made Justice of the Peace in April 1915. In January 1916, Parr signed a petition organised by Sir Henry Pollock to the Secretary of State for the Colonies for constitution reform in Hong Kong. It demanded a larger increase of unofficial members in the Executive Council and also all unofficial members in the Legislative Council elected by the Hong Kong General Chamber of Commerce and unofficial Justices of Peace. He was member of the Hong Kong General Chamber of Commerce and when the Chamber moved for the exclusion of the German merchants after the First World War in 1917 under the chairmanship of P. H. Holyoak, he raised his support to the resolution and suggested to send their demand to the London government.

On 13 May 1919 he was elected by the committee to be the representative of the Chamber of Commerce in the Legislative Council during the absence of P. H. Holyoak. He was temporarily again  appointed by the Hong Kong government as to the Legislative Council in September 1919. He was appointed again to the Legislative Council in March 1920 and continued to serve until his resignation in 1923 In September 1920, he was appointed to the Executive Council as an unofficial member during E. H. Sharp was on leave.  

He was also member of the Royal Hong Kong Golf Club and representative of the club on the Recreation Grounds Committee and had also been appointed to the Authorized Architects' Committee.

References

Chairmen of HSBC
Hong Kong businesspeople
British businesspeople
Hong Kong people of British descent
British expatriates in Hong Kong
British expatriates in China
British expatriates in Japan
British expatriates in India
Members of the Executive Council of Hong Kong
Members of the Legislative Council of Hong Kong